WICU may refer to:

 WICU (AM), a radio station (1310 AM) licensed to serve Warren, Pennsylvania, United States
 WICU-FM, a radio station (92.7 FM) licensed to serve Lawrence Park, Pennsylvania
 WICU-TV, a television station (channel 12) licensed to serve Erie, Pennsylvania
 WFNN, a radio station (1330 AM) licensed to serve Erie, Pennsylvania, which held the call sign WICU from 1957 to 1967